Millom is a civil parish in the Borough of Copeland, Cumbria, England.  It contains twelve buildings that are recorded in the National Heritage List for England.  Of these, two are listed at Grade I, the highest of the three grades, and the others are at Grade II, the lowest grade.  The parish contains the town of Millom and the surrounding countryside.  Until the middle of the 19th century the parish was mainly rural.  The railway arrived in 1850, iron mining began in the 1860s, and the town grew rapidly.  Only one listed building survives from the mining industry, a former office.  The other listed buildings are two churches, one dating from the 13th century, the other from the 19th century, and structures in and around their churchyards, a former manor house with a great tower and associated gate piers, and three war memorials.


Key

Buildings

References

Citations

Sources

Lists of listed buildings in Cumbria
Listed